Beyond and Back is a 1978 documentary and "death-sploitation flick" released by Sunn Classic Pictures that deals with the subject of near death experiences.

Production notes
Beyond and Back was produced by Sunn Classic Pictures, a Utah-based independent film company that specialized in releasing low-budget message movies to non-urban audiences. Along with such features as In Search of Noah's Ark (1976) and In Search of Historic Jesus (1979), the film was one of a series of releases from the company that attempted to present convincing scientific evidence for Christian theology.

Based in part on a book by evangelist Ralph Wilkerson, the idea for Beyond and Back was suggested to Sunn Pictures by a freelance writer who submitted a treatment for the film after reading about the film studio in Writer's Digest. The film's screenwriter, Stephen Lord, was a respected television screenwriter, having written scripts for such notable sci-fi/horror programs as The Outer Limits and Kolchak: The Night Stalker. Directing chores went to James L. Conway, who had helmed Sunn's speculative fiction vehicle The Lincoln Conspiracy the previous year.  The movie was filmed by cinematographer Henning Schellerup, a veteran of late '60s and early '70s porn films such as Come One, Come All (1970) and Heterosexualis (1973).

Parts of the film were shot in Park City, Salt Lake City, and Heber in Utah.

Promotion
Since Beyond and Back never received a traditional wide release, it was able to largely avoid scrutiny from the national media. Sunn Classic Pictures mostly screened its films in smaller towns and non-urban areas.  It was also popular at drive-in movie theaters.  This approach "avoided the audiences and the critical media in Los Angeles and New York... if the film failed in any single market, negative word of mouth did not spread to the next locale."

Wasser's assertion has, however, been disputed: "Wow, I saw it when I was 6. Saw it in Brooklyn".

Born-again Christian background and content
Filmed entirely on location in Utah, Beyond and Back was produced by Charles E. Sellier Jr. At the time of the film's release, Sellier noted that he:

Critical and box office reception
The New York Times film critic Janet Maslin criticized the film for its inability to answer the many questions it raised, adding:  In his January 1979 Chicago Sun-Times review, Roger Ebert gave the film one star, noting that it:   The film appears on rogerebert.com, "Ebert's Most Hated" list, as well as in his 2000 book, I Hated, Hated, Hated This Movie.

Produced very inexpensively, the film was a major commercial success. It earned nearly $24 million in U.S. box office receipts and was one of the top 30 top-earning films in the U.S. for 1978.

Beyond Death's Door (1979)
Beyond Death’s Door (1979), was a follow-up to Beyond and Back.  Directed by Henning Schellerup, it featured a framing story of three doctors working at a hospital, and their experiences with patients’ descriptions of Heaven, Hell and out-of-body experiences.  The film featured vignettes from its predecessor, including the segments on reincarnation and Duncan MacDougall’s “21 grams experiment.”

The film was based on the book of the same name, written by Maurice Rawlings.

References

External links
 
 
 
 Beyond and Back (1978) on the Internet Archive
 Beyond Death's Door (1979) on the Internet Archive
 

1978 films
1978 documentary films
1970s English-language films
American documentary films
Documentary films about the paranormal
Films about evangelicalism
Films directed by James L. Conway
Films shot in Utah
Near-death experiences
1970s American films